Chiswick Business Park is a business park in Gunnersbury, West London, fronting on to Chiswick High Road.

History

Bus maintenance site 
The land on which the Chiswick Business Park was built had been owned by the Rothschild family and planted as orchards in the 19th century. In 1921, the London General Omnibus Company opened a 33-acre bus maintenance facility on a site bounded by Chiswick High Road to the south, the North London line to the east and the Piccadilly line to the north. At its peak it employed 3,500 men, by 1985 it was down to 700. It was closed by London Regional Transport in 1990.

Design and construction 
In 1990–1991, architects Terry Farrell & Partners designed a master plan for a Stanhope and Trafalgar House consortium for the site with buildings designed by Foster Associates and Peter Foggo around the main piazza, and others by Rogers Stirk Harbour + Partners and ABK Architects around a smaller square to one side. Outline planning permission was granted in 1991 for 11 buildings to be built.

In 1996, Kværner took ownership of the site, selling it in 1999 to the Chiswick Park Unit Trust led by Schroders and Aberdeen Property Investors with Stanhope as development manager. Rogers Stirk Harbour + Partners was commissioned to prepare a new master plan. The first building was completed at the Chiswick High Road end in December 2000 with a further 11 built in stages, the last being completed in September 2015. Buildings range in height from four to twelve floors.

The Chiswick Park Unit Trust sold the park to the Blackstone Group in January 2011. Blackstone sold the property to China Investment Corporation in January 2014. Blackstone retained ownership of building 7, until selling it in February 2020 to Stanhope, while building 8 is owned by Abrdn.

Footbridge 

Chiswick Park Footbridge, to the north of the Gunnersbury Triangle Nature Reserve, was opened in January 2019 to connect the business park with Chiswick Park tube station.

Reception 

The Buildings of England calls the architectural lineup "a galaxy of famous names", contrasting the park's coherent layout with the unplanned office blocks that had "sprouted up haphazardly" in the rest of Gunnersbury.

Tenants
Tenants in 2021 include CBS, Danone, Ericsson, Foxtons, IMG, Otis, Paramount Pictures, PepsiCo, Seadrill, Singapore Airlines, Starbucks, Tullow Oil and United International Pictures. Richmond, The American International University in London announced they would be moving into the business park in September 2022.

References

External links

Buildings and structures in Chiswick
China Investment Corporation
Information technology company headquarters in the United Kingdom
London Borough of Hounslow
Mass media company headquarters in the United Kingdom